Battlemind is both the mental orientation developed during a combat zone deployment and a program developed at Walter Reed Army Institute of Research (WRAIR) intended to reduce its impact on personal post-deployment issues.

Mental orientation
In the definition provided by the U.S. Army Medical Command 

The significance of Battlemind in the Medical Command's context is that "Battlemind skills helped you survive in combat, but may cause you problems if not adapted when you get home."

Initial writings on the subject focused on the utility of battlemind while in service, while several recent works focus on treatment and self-help.

Program
The first Battlemind product was a mental health post-deployment briefing. It quickly became a training system supporting soldiers and families across the seven phases of the deployment cycle.

The Battlemind system now includes separate pre-deployment training modules for soldiers, unit leaders, health care providers and spouses. Psychological debriefings are given in theater and upon redeployment. There is also a post-deployment module for spouses and several post-deployment modules for soldiers.

Controversy
Some veteran groups have expressed concern or curiosity about the effectiveness of the Battlemind program in addressing posttraumatic stress disorder.

External links
 https://web.archive.org/web/20080820212750/https://www.battlemind.army.mil/

References

Applied psychology
Military psychiatry